Panama (or Panamá) is a republic in Central America.  

Panama may also refer to:

Geography and places

Republic of Panama 
Isthmus of Panama, the isthmus on which the country is located
Panama Canal, a canal through the isthmus
Gulf of Panama, a bay south of the isthmus
Panamá Province, one of that country's component provinces
Panamá District, one of the districts in the Province
Panama City, the capital of the Republic, the Province and the District
Panamá Viejo, the oldest part of the city
Panamá Oeste Province, a new province created from the original Panamá Province

Pre-independence entities
Real Audiencia of Panama
Panama State
Department of Panama

Brazil 
Panamá, Goiás, a city in the state of Goiás

Canada 
Terminus Brossard-Panama (AMT), a bus terminal in Brossard, Quebec
Panama station, a planned light rail station which will replace Terminus Brossard-Panama

Chile 
Panamá, Santa Cruz

Sri Lanka 
 Panama, Sri Lanka

United States 
Panama, California
Panama, California, alternate name of Rio Bravo, a former settlement
Panama City, Florida
Panama City Beach, Florida
Panama, Illinois
Panama, Indiana
Panama, Iowa
Panama, Missouri
Panama, Nebraska
Panama, New York
Panama, Oklahoma

Music
 Panama (band), an electronic band based in Sydney, Australia
 Panama (album), by A Balladeer
 "Panama" (jazz standard), a traditional jazz tune
 "Panama" (song), by Van Halen
"Panama", a song by The Avener

Film and television
 Panama (2015 film), a Serbian drama film
 Panama (2022 film), an American action thriller film
 "Panama" (Prison Break), a television episode

Ships
USS Panama (SP-101), a United States Navy patrol boat in commission from 1917 to 1920
, a passenger ship
, a passenger liner converted to troop transport during World War II

Other uses
Panama (ad system), an online advertising platform 
Panama (cocktail)
Panama Papers, a set of 11.5 million documents detailing attorney–client information, leaked in 2016
PANAMA, a cryptographic primitive that can be used as a hash function and a stream cipher
Panama disease, a banana plant disease
Panama hat
Panama (sheep), an American sheep breed
Panama weave, a.k.a. basketweave, a type of fabric

See also
 Pamana (disambiguation)
USS Panaman (ID-3299), a United States Navy cargo ship and troop transport in commission from 1918 to 1919